The Traverse River is an  river in Keweenaw and Houghton counties on the Upper Peninsula of Michigan in the United States. It flows into Lake Superior just north of Keweenaw Bay.

See also
List of rivers of Michigan

References

Michigan  Streamflow Data from the USGS

Rivers of Michigan
Rivers of Keweenaw County, Michigan
Rivers of Houghton County, Michigan
Tributaries of Lake Superior